Inquilaab is a 2002 Bengali action thriller film directed by Anup Sengupta. The film features actors Prosenjit Chatterjee and Arpita Pal in the lead roles. Music of the film has been composed by S. Shubhayu.

Cast 
 Prosenjit Chatterjee
 Arpita Pal
 Chiranjit Chakraborty as Abhinash Choudhary
 Abhishek Chatterjee
 Chinmoy Roy
 Debesh Roy Chowdhury as Murrarimohan Dutta
 Mrinal Mukherjee as Mahadeb Sanyal
 Anamika Saha as Leelabati
 Lokesh Ghosh
 Biplab Chatterjee
 Ramen Roy Chowdhury as Neelkanta Roy

References 

Bengali-language Indian films
2002 films
2000s Bengali-language films
Films directed by Anup Sengupta
Indian action thriller films
2002 action thriller films